Cipriano Pons (born 17 March 1890, date of death unknown) was an Argentine fencer. He competed in the team épée competition at the 1924 Summer Olympics.

References

External links
 

1890 births
Year of death missing
Argentine male fencers
Argentine épée fencers
Olympic fencers of Argentina
Fencers at the 1924 Summer Olympics
20th-century Argentine people